Josefine 'Pepa' Kolbe was a female Austrian international table tennis player.

She won double bronze at the 1930 World Table Tennis Championships in the singles  and in the doubles with Etta Neumann. Kolbe played at the Badener AC Club.

See also
 List of table tennis players
 List of World Table Tennis Championships medalists

References

Austrian female table tennis players
World Table Tennis Championships medalists